Goethe Museum may refer to:

 Frankfurt Goethe Museum, Frankfurt am Main, Germany, see Goethe House
 Goethe-Nationalmuseum, Weimar, Germany
 Goethe-Museum, Düsseldorf, Germany, see Schloss Jägerhof